Holbeck is a village and civil parish in Nottinghamshire, England. It is located 6 miles south-west of Worksop. According to the 2001 census it had a population of 449, reducing to 195 (including Holbeck Woodhouse and Welbeck) at the 2011 Census. It is an estate village built for the Dukes of Portland at Welbeck Abbey.

St Winifred's Church

The parish church of St Winifred was built between 1913 and 1916, for the benefit of the Dukes of Portland, and as a burial place for the dukes and their families. It also contains the tombstone of Lady Ottoline Morrel.

References

External links

Villages in Nottinghamshire
Civil parishes in Nottinghamshire
Bassetlaw District